Eisen is a 2000 role-playing game supplement for 7th Sea published by Alderac Entertainment Group.

Contents
Eisen is a supplement in which information is included regarding the seven königreichen lands of the Iron Princes.

Reviews
Backstab #24
Pyramid
Games Unplugged #2 (Aug./Sept., 2000)

References

Role-playing game books
Role-playing game supplements introduced in 2000